The Century Dictionary and Cyclopedia is one of the largest encyclopedic dictionaries of the English language. In its day it was compared favorably with the Oxford English Dictionary, and frequently consulted for more factual information than would normally be the case for a dictionary.

History 
The Century Dictionary is based on The Imperial Dictionary of the English Language, edited by Rev. John Ogilvie (1797–1867) and published by W. G. Blackie and Co. of Scotland, 1847–1850, which in turn is an expansion of the 1841 second edition of Noah Webster's American Dictionary. In 1882 The Century Company of New York bought the American rights to The Imperial Dictionary from Blackie and Son.

The first edition of the Century Dictionary was published from 1889 to 1891 by The Century Company, and was described as "six volumes in twenty four". The first edition runs to 7,046 pages and features some 10,000 wood-engraved illustrations. It was edited by Sanskrit scholar and linguist William Dwight Whitney, with Benjamin Eli Smith's assistance.

In 1895 a 10-volume edition was published, with the first eight volumes containing the dictionary proper, and the last two containing a biographical dictionary and a world atlas. Editions in either the 10 or 8 volume format were published in 1899, 1901, 1902, 1903 and 1904. In 1901 the title and subtitle changed slightly from The Century Dictionary; an encyclopedic lexicon of the English language to The Century Dictionary and Cyclopedia; a work of universal reference in all departments of knowledge, with a new atlas of the world. Further editions were published in 1906, 1909 and 1911, this time in 12 volumes each.

After Whitney's death in 1894, supplementary volumes were published under Smith's supervision, including The Century Cyclopedia of Names (1894) and The Century Atlas (1897).  A two-volume Supplement of new vocabulary, published in 1909, completed the dictionary.  A reformatted edition, The Century Dictionary and Cyclopedia, was published in 1911 in twelve quarto volumes: ten of vocabulary, plus the volume of names and the atlas.  This set went through several printings, the last in 1914.  The same year, the ten vocabulary volumes were published as one giant volume, about 8500 pages in a very thin paper. The now much coveted India paper edition also appeared around this time, usually in five double volumes (rarely, in 10 single volumes) plus one additional for the Cyclopedia.

The completed dictionary contained over 500,000 entries, more than Webster's New International or Funk and Wagnalls New Standard, the largest other dictionaries of the period.  Each form of a word was treated separately, and liberal numbers of quotations and additional information were included to support the definitions.  In its etymologies, Greek words were not transliterated.

Although no revised edition of the dictionary was ever again published, an abridged edition with new words and other features, The New Century Dictionary (edited by H.G. Emery and K.G. Brewster; revision editor, Catherine B. Avery,) was published by Appleton-Century-Crofts of New York in 1927, and reprinted in various forms for over thirty-five years.  The New Century became the basis for the American College Dictionary, the first Random House Dictionary, in 1947.  The three-volume New Century Cyclopedia of Names, an expansion of the 1894 volume, was published in 1954, edited by Clarence Barnhart.

The Century Dictionary was admired for the quality of its entries, the craftsmanship in its design, typography, and binding, and its excellent illustrations.  It has been used as an information source for the makers of many later dictionaries, including editors of the Oxford English Dictionary, who cited it over 2,000 times in the first edition. In 1913, a Ph.D. dissertation on "American Dictionaries" concluded its 14-page chapter on the Century Dictionary with the assessment that the work "far surpasses anything in American lexicography".

Typography and typesetting

The Century Dictionary was typeset and printed by Theodore Low De Vinne, who gave it a typographic aesthetic that foreshadowed a norm of 20th century book printing. Prefigured in De Vinne's work on the Century Magazine from its origins as Scribner's Monthly in 1870, the printer eschewed the thin hairlines and reduced legibility of the 'modern' serif typefaces that were predominantly used in the mid-eighteen-hundreds, favouring Caslon as a sturdier and more legible 'old style' face instead. Due to the complexity of typesetting a large dictionary, De Vinne also devised an elaborate composition stand that gave compositors access to more than seven hundred boxes of type and special sorts within easy reach.

Digitization efforts 
The works are out of copyright, and efforts have been made to digitize the volumes.

24-part set 
1889–91

Ten-volume set

Twelve-volume set
 1911, University of Michigan and Cornell University

Citations

General sources
 Adams, James Truslow. Dictionary of American History. New York: Scribner, 1940.

External links

 The complete Century Dictionary is in image form, where it can be searched by the word or viewed by the page in its original form, with zoom-in option. 
 The Century Dictionary, and Supplement online with easy word search

1889 non-fiction books
English dictionaries
Works about American English